Standings and Results for Group C of the Regular Season phase of the 2007-08 Euroleague basketball tournament.

Main page: Euroleague 2007-08

Standings

 Fenerbahçe are fourth based on a 3-1 record against Partizan and Lottomatica, with Partizan at 2-2 and Lottomatica at 1-3.

Fixtures and results
All times given below are in Central European Time.

Unless otherwise indicated, all attendance totals are from the corresponding match report posted on the official Euroleague site and included with each game summary.

Game 1
October 24–25, 2007

Game 2
October 31 - November 1, 2007

Game 3
November 6–8, 2007

Game 4
November 14–15, 2007

Game 5
November 21–22, 2007

Game 6
November 28–29, 2007

Game 7
December 5–6, 2007

Game 8
December 12–13, 2007

Game 9
December 19–20, 2007

Game 10
January 2–3, 2008

Notes:
 In the Lottomatica-Fenerbahçe game, Fener's Mirsad Türkcan became the first player since the creation of the Euroleague in 2000 to amass 1,000 rebounds in Euroleague play.

Game 11
January 9–10, 2008

Game 12
January 16–17, 2008

Game 13
January 23–24, 2008

Game 14
January 31, 2008

Notes and references

2007–08 Euroleague